The 1966–67 Scottish Division One was won by Celtic by three points over city rivals Rangers. St Mirren and Ayr United finished 17th and 18th respectively and were relegated to the 1967–68 Second Division.

League table

Results

See also
Nine in a row

References

1
Scottish Division One seasons
Scot